Carbajal may refer to:

 Carbajal Valley, Tierra del Fuego Province, Argentina
 Fuentes de Carbajal, a municipality in Castile and León, Spain

People 
 Garcí Manuel de Carbajal (fl. 1540), Spanish conquistador, founder of city Arequipa in Peru
 José Carbajal (Uruguayan musician) (1943–2010)
 José María Jesús Carbajal (1809–1874) Mexican freedom fighter
 Luis de Carbajal (1531–after 1618), Spanish painter
 Antonio Carbajal (born 1929), Mexican football goalkeeper
 Michael Carbajal (born 1967), USA boxer
 Rubén Carbajal (born 1993), Mexican American actor
 Salud Carbajal (born 1964), American politician

See also
 Carvajal, a surname